The 2015–16 UEFA Champions League qualifying phase and play-off round began on 30 June and ended on 26 August 2015. A total of 56 teams competed in the qualifying phase and play-off round to decide 10 of the 32 places in the group stage of the 2015–16 UEFA Champions League.

All times were CEST (UTC+2).

Round and draw dates
All draws were held at UEFA headquarters in Nyon, Switzerland.

Format
In the qualifying phase and play-off round, each tie was played over two legs, with each team playing one leg at home. The team that scored more goals on aggregate over the two legs advanced to the next round. If the aggregate score was level, the away goals rule was applied, i.e., the team that scored more goals away from home over the two legs advanced. If away goals were also equal, then 30 minutes of extra time was played, divided into two 15-minute halves. The away goals rule was again applied after extra time, i.e., if there were goals scored during extra time and the aggregate score was still level, the visiting team advanced by virtue of more away goals scored. If no goals were scored during extra time, the tie was decided by penalty shoot-out.

In the draws for each round, teams were seeded based on their UEFA club coefficients at the beginning of the season, with the teams divided into seeded and unseeded pots. A seeded team was drawn against an unseeded team, with the order of legs in each tie decided by draw. Due to the limited time between matches, the draws for the second and third qualifying rounds took place before the results of the previous round were known. For these draws (or in any cases where the result of a tie in the previous round was not known at the time of the draw), the seeding was carried out under the assumption that the team with the higher coefficient of an undecided tie advanced to this round, which means if the team with the lower coefficient was to advance, it simply took the seeding of its defeated opponent. Prior to the draws, UEFA formed "groups" in accordance with the principles set by the Club Competitions Committee, but they were purely for convenience of the draw and for ensuring that teams from the same association were not drawn against each other, and did not resemble any real groupings in the sense of the competition.

Teams
There were two routes which the teams were separated into during qualifying:
Champions Route, which included all domestic champions which had not qualified for the group stage.
League Route (also called the Non-champions Path or the Best-placed Path), which included all domestic non-champions which had not qualified for the group stage.

A total of 56 teams (41 in Champions Route, 15 in League Route) were involved in the qualifying phase and play-off round. The 10 winners of the play-off round (5 in Champions Route, 5 in League Route) advanced to the group stage to join the 22 teams which entered in the group stage. The 15 losers of the third qualifying round entered the Europa League play-off round, and the 10 losers of the play-off round entered the Europa League group stage.

Below are the participating teams (with their 2015 UEFA club coefficients), grouped by their starting rounds.

Champions Route

League Route

First qualifying round

Seeding
A total of eight teams played in the first qualifying round. The draw was held on 22 June 2015.

Summary
The first legs were played on 30 June and 1 July, and the second legs were played on 7 July 2015.

|}

Matches

Lincoln Red Imps won 2–1 on aggregate.

1–1 on aggregate; Crusaders won on away goals.

Pyunik won 4–2 on aggregate.

The New Saints won 6–2 on aggregate.

Second qualifying round

Seeding
A total of 34 teams played in the second qualifying round: 30 teams which entered in this round, and the four winners of the first qualifying round. The draw was held on 22 June 2015.

Notes

Summary
The first legs were played on 14 and 15 July, and the second legs were played on 21 and 22 July 2015.

|}

Notes

Matches

Maccabi Tel Aviv won 6–3 on aggregate.

1–1 on aggregate; APOEL won on away goals.

Qarabağ won 1–0 on aggregate.

Lech Poznań won 3–0 on aggregate.

Astana won 3–2 on aggregate.

BATE Borisov won 2–1 on aggregate.

HJK won 4–1 on aggregate.

Midtjylland won 3–0 on aggregate.

Molde won 5–1 on aggregate.

Malmö FF won 1–0 on aggregate.

Celtic won 6–1 on aggregate.

Steaua București won 4–3 on aggregate.

Partizan won 3–0 on aggregate.

Milsami Orhei won 3–1 on aggregate.

Dinamo Zagreb won 4–1 on aggregate.

Skënderbeu won 6–4 on aggregate.

Videoton won 2–1 on aggregate.

Third qualifying round

Seeding
The third qualifying round was split into two separate sections: Champions Route (for league champions) and League Route (for league non-champions). The losing teams in both sections entered the 2015–16 UEFA Europa League play-off round.

A total of 30 teams played in the third qualifying round:
Champions Route: three teams which entered in this round, and the 17 winners of the second qualifying round.
League Route: ten teams which entered in this round.

The draw was held on 17 July 2015.

Notes

Summary
The first legs were played on 28 and 29 July, and the second legs were played on 4 and 5 August 2015.

|+Champions Route

|}

|+League Route

|}

Matches

Basel won 4–1 on aggregate.

Skënderbeu won 4–0 on aggregate.

Astana won 4–3 on aggregate.

Celtic won 1–0 on aggregate.

Partizan won 5–3 on aggregate.

2–2 on aggregate; APOEL won on away goals.

Maccabi Tel Aviv won 3–2 on aggregate.

4–4 on aggregate; Dinamo Zagreb won on away goals.

BATE Borisov won 2–1 on aggregate.

Malmö won 3–2 on aggregate.

Club Brugge won 4–2 on aggregate.

Monaco won 7–1 on aggregate.

CSKA Moscow won 5–4 on aggregate.

Rapid Wien won 5–4 on aggregate.

Shakhtar Donetsk won 3–0 on aggregate.

Play-off round

Seeding
The play-off round was split into two sections: Champions Route (for league champions) and League Route (for league non-champions). The losing teams in both sections entered the 2015–16 UEFA Europa League group stage.

A total of 20 teams played in the play-off round:
Champions Route: the ten Champions Route winners of the third qualifying round.
League Route: five teams which entered in this round, and the five League Route winners of the third qualifying round.

The draw was held on 7 August 2015.

Notes

Summary
The first legs were played on 18 and 19 August, and the second legs were played on 25 and 26 August 2015.

|+Champions Route

|}

|+League Route

|}

Matches

Astana won 2–1 on aggregate.

Dinamo Zagreb won 6–2 on aggregate.

Malmö FF won 4–3 on aggregate.

3–3 on aggregate; Maccabi Tel Aviv won on away goals.

2–2 on aggregate; BATE Borisov won on away goals.

Bayer Leverkusen won 3–1 on aggregate.

Manchester United won 7–1 on aggregate.

CSKA Moscow won 4–3 on aggregate.

Shakhtar Donetsk won 3–2 on aggregate.

Valencia won 4–3 on aggregate.

Statistics
There were 240 goals in 92 matches in the qualifying phase and play-off round, for an average of 2.61 goals per match.

Top goalscorers

Top assists

Notes

References

External links
2015–16 UEFA Champions League

Qualifying Rounds
2015-16
June 2015 sports events in Europe
July 2015 sports events in Europe
August 2015 sports events in Europe